The 1919 Dayton Triangles season was their seventh season, and last season, in the Ohio League.  The team posted a 5–2–1 record and would become a charter member of the National Football League, the following season.

Schedule

Game notes

References
Pro Football Archives: Dayton Triangles 1919

Dayton Triangles seasons
Dayton Triangles
Dayton Triangles